The men's welterweight (67 kg/147.4 lbs) Low-Kick category at the W.A.K.O. World Championships 2007 in Belgrade was the sixth lightest of the male Low-Kick tournaments, involving seventeen fighters from two continents (Europe and Asia).  Each of the matches was three rounds of two minutes each and were fought under Low-Kick rules.

As there were too few competitors for a thirty-two man tournament, fifteen of the fighters had byes to the second round.  The tournament winner was Russian Nikolay Shtakhanov who won gold by defeating Turkey's Yahya Alemdag by unanimous decision in their final match.  Serb Nebojsa Denic and Azerbaijani Ramil Nadirov won bronze medals for reaching the semi finals.

Results

Key

See also
List of WAKO Amateur World Championships
List of WAKO Amateur European Championships
List of male kickboxers

References

External links
 WAKO World Association of Kickboxing Organizations Official Site

Kickboxing events at the WAKO World Championships 2007 Belgrade
2007 in kickboxing
Kickboxing in Serbia